The Faceless Enemy (French: L'ennemi sans visage) is a 1946 French crime film directed by Robert-Paul Dagan and Maurice Cammage and starring Louise Carletti, Frank Villard and Jean Tissier. It was based on the novel of the same title by Stanislas-André Steeman. It featured his long-running detective . The film's sets were designed by the art director Marcel Magniez.

Synopsis
A professor needs to do experiments on a living body, and so he is assigned a condemned man. However soon the scientist is found dead and the convict has escaped. Inspector Wens takes over the case.

Cast
 Louise Carletti as 	Arlette
 Frank Villard as Inspecteur Wens / Inspector Wens
 Roger Karl as Le professeur Artus / Professor Artus
 Jean Tissier as 	Tiburce Artus
 Jean Témerson as 	Hector / Le valet / Hector - the butler
 Maurice Lagrenée as Clarence Jude	
 André Fouché as 	Maxime Artus
 Jim Gérald as 	Ramshow
 Denyse Réal as 	L'infirmière
 Huguette Montréal as 	Andrée
 Eugène Yvernès as 	Le chauffeur 
 Jean Berton as Le commissaire 
 Paul Delauzac as 	Le docteur

References

Bibliography
 Goble, Alan. The Complete Index to Literary Sources in Film. Walter de Gruyter, 1999.
 Hardy, Phil. The BFI Companion to Crime. A&C Black, 1997.

External links 
 

1946 films
1940s French-language films
1946 crime films
French crime films
Films directed by Maurice Cammage
Films based on Belgian novels
1940s French films
Films based on works by Stanislas-André Steeman